Prom is a 2011 American teen romantic comedy film directed by Joe Nussbaum written by Katie Wech and produced by Ted Griffin and Justin Springer. It was released on April 29, 2011, by Walt Disney Pictures. The film was the first major production that was filmed with Arri Alexa cameras to be released in theatres.

Plot

Nova Prescott (Aimee Teegarden) is on the prom committee with her friends Mei Kwan (Yin Chang), Ali Gomez (Janelle Ortiz), Brandon Roberts (Jonathan Keltz) and Rolo Banus (Joe Adler). Nova hopes Brandon, whom she has a crush on, will ask her to go to the prom. Lloyd Taylor (Nicholas Braun) complains to his stepsister Tess Torres (Raini Rodriguez) that he has no date. Mei discovers that she has been accepted at a different university than her boyfriend Justin Wexler (Jared Kusnitz) and worries about telling him as prom approaches. Lucas Arnaz (Nolan Sotillo) is in love with his lab partner Simone (Danielle Campbell) and turns to his friend Corey Doyle (Cameron Monaghan) to help him ask her to the prom. The only one who does not care about the prom is Jesse Richter (Thomas McDonell). He works at a local market, stocking shelves; plays truant, rides his motorcycle across the schoolyard, and behaves inappropriately. Principal Dunnan (Jere Burns) tries to talk but does not get through to him.

Meanwhile, Jordan Lundley (Kylie Bunbury) finds an earring in her boyfriend's car, Tyler Barso (DeVaughn Nixon) but he assures her that he's not cheating. To show his love, he takes her on a date in the shed where the prom decorations were stored; Tyler forgot to extinguish one candle before they left, and the shed and everything in it was burned down. With only 3 weeks left, Nova is left to manufacture replacement props alone. The principal, annoyed at Jesse's lack of respect, gives him a choice: either he helps Nova with the rebuild, or he can't graduate. Jesse accepts reluctantly, as does Nova; and realize they need each other's cooperation. While Brandon disappoints Nova by not asking her to the prom, she and Jesse grow closer, despite the fact that he finds the idea of prom ridiculous. When Nova discovers that the prom theme of the neighboring school is the same as theirs, Jesse decides to sneak into their school to check it out. However, the security guard notices them, and the police catch them after they escape. The police call Nova's parents, and when Nova's father arrives, he snaps at Jesse.

Meanwhile, Lloyd still cannot find a date and becomes frustrated. Lucas asks Simone to a barbecue hosted by his friend Tyler. Tyler tries to talk and flirt with her, but she rejects him, because he is dating Jordan. Meanwhile, the stress in Mei and Justin's relationship reaches its breaking point, and Mei cancels on Justin for fear of telling him about her acceptance. At school, Lucas blows off Corey to spend more time with Simone and invites her to study for the upcoming test with him. However, en route to the library, Simone is stopped by Tyler, who convinces her to talk with him about his feelings. Jordan sees the two talking and immediately realizes the situation. After school, Nova apologizes to Jesse for her father’s behavior. Later, she brings him along as she goes dress shopping, for a second opinion. Back at school, Simone apologizes to Lucas for having ditched him. She has a surprise, tickets to a concert, where Stick Hippo (his and Corey's favorite band) is opening. Lucas wants to take Simone instead of Corey, much to his dismay. Jordan dumps Tyler for his unfaithfulness and decides to go to prom alone. This prompts him to ask Simone to prom, which is the same night as the concert, and she agrees. Simone tells Lucas that she cannot attend the concert.

Mei apologizes to Justin and tells him the truth, but instead of feeling hurt, he tells her he is proud of her, and agree to attend prom together. As Lloyd gets rejected by another girl, he spots Lucas sitting outside the school, looking dejected. He learns of his situation and tells Lucas his own problem. Two nights before the prom, Nova, Ali, and Mei are in Nova's room, chatting. Nova confesses to them that she has feelings for Jesse, which her father overhears. The next day, Nova's father tells Jesse he cannot ask Nova to prom, because he is "bringing her down". That afternoon, Jesse is unusually hostile towards Nova and deserts her. On prom night, Lucas climbs a tree to reach Simone's window. He tells her how he feels and begs her not to go to prom, but she does anyway. Disappointed, Lucas realizes what a bad friend he has been to Corey and offers him the other concert ticket.

At her house, Nova is heartbroken. Her father explains that he was the one who told Jesse not to ask her to prom. Angered, Nova storms out of the house. Meanwhile, at Lloyd's house, it is revealed that he is taking his sister to prom. At Jesse's house, his mother has a talk with him, and he realizes that he should still take Nova to prom. At the school, Tyler leads Simone into the building, and almost immediately abandons her. Simone finds out that it was actually Jordan who dumped Tyler, and Tyler had gone to her with no other option. As Tyler and Jordan are pronounced prom king and queen, Jordan refuses to participate in the king-and-queen dance. When Tyler asks Simone to dance, she refuses and leaves. She goes outside to wait for Lucas, and they share a dance. Nova is having a bad time, and when Ali tells her the fountain centerpiece has failed, she cannot take it anymore. As she is about to leave, she hears the fountain start again, and knows the only person who could have fixed it was Jesse. He walks up to her and asks her to prom. She agrees, and they dance followed by a kiss.

Cast
 Aimee Teegarden as Nova Prescott, the class president who is determined to host a great prom. 
 Thomas McDonell as Jesse Richter, the school bad boy.
 Cameron Monaghan as Corey Doyle, Lucas' best friend.
 Yin Chang as Mei Kwan, Nova's super smart friend who is dating Justin. 
 Janelle Ortiz as Ali Gomez, Nova's other friend
 Nolan Sotillo as Lucas Arnaz, Corey's shy music loving best friend who harbors a deep crush on Simone.
 Danielle Campbell as Simone Daniels, plays guitar and piano and is Lucas' lab partner and his prom date.
 Kylie Bunbury as Jordan Lundley, Tyler Barso's girlfriend who is extremely popular
 DeVaughn Nixon as Tyler Barso, Jordan's lacrosse-playing, self-absorbed boyfriend. 
 Jared Kusnitz as Justin Wexler, Mei's steady, easy-going boyfriend.
 Nicholas Braun as Lloyd Taylor, the shy, "invisible" kid at school who has trouble getting a date to prom
 Joe Adler as Robert 'Rolo' Banus, Nova's absent-minded friend
 Jonathan Keltz as Brandon, Nova's crush
 Christine Elise McCarthy as Sandra Linsey 
 Raini Rodriguez as Tess, Lloyd's stepsister who tries to help her stepbrother in his hour of need.
 Aimee-Lynn Chadwick as Rachel, a goth girl.
 Dean Norris as Frank Prescott, Nova's over-protective father.
 Faith Ford as Kitty Prescott
 Robbie Tucker as Charlie Richter, Jesse's little brother
 Jere Burns as Principal Dunnan
 Allie Trimm as Betsy
 Amy Pietz as Mrs. Doyle
 Carlease Burke as Rhoda Wainwright
 Blair Fowler as Leah
 Madison Riley as Kristen
 Rocco Nugent as Anton
 Ivy Malone as Alice
 Chloe Little as Janel Lundley
 Kofi Siriboe as Max
 Kristopher Higgins as Derek

Production
While Prom is set in Michigan, filming took place in Los Angeles, California.

Reception

Box office
In its opening weekend the film grossed $4.7 million in 2,730 theaters, ranking fifth. By the end of its run, Prom grossed $10.1 million domestically.

Critical reception 
Review aggregate Rotten Tomatoes reports that 36% of 89 critics recommended the film, with an average rating of 5.1/10. The site's critics consensus reads: "Given its flatly descriptive title and live-action Disney pedigree, Prom is more nuanced and less cynical -- but also just as corny and clichéd -- as you might expect." At Metacritic the film has a weighted average score of 50 out of 100, based on 24 critics, indicating "mixed or average reviews". Audiences polled by CinemaScore gave the film an average grade of "B+" on an A+ to F scale.

Salon film critic Andre O'Heir gave the film a negative review, calling it "a would-be tween-oriented hit so scrubbed and sanitized and not worthy of paying attention to that it can barely be said to exist at all".  Another film critic, Claudia Puig of USA Today, notes that Proms "entertainment quotient comes up deficient". Conversely, Boxoffice Magazine film critic Pete Hammond offers a more positive review of the film, calling it a "highly entertaining original movie that's funny, touching, and real", while mixed reviewers note that it is a "predictable but painless pastiche of high school drama cliches that will give its intended tween audience a lot to squeal about."

Home media
The film was released by Walt Disney Studios Home Entertainment on Blu-ray Disc, DVD, and movie download on August 30, 2011. The release will be produced in two different physical packages: a 2-disc combo pack (Blu-ray Disc and DVD) and a 1-disc DVD. The film will also be released as a movie download option, in both standard definition and high definition.  All versions of the release will include the "Bloopers" and "Putting on Prom" extras, while the Blu-ray Disc combo pack will additionally include a bonus short called "Last Chance Lloyd" (directed by Taz Goldstein) that expands on Lloyd's search for a prom date as well as four deleted scenes, and seven music videos.  The film's download version includes the "Bloopers" and "Putting on Prom" extras as well as three music videos by Allstar Weekend, Neon Trees, and Moon.

Soundtrack

Pop band Allstar Weekend's song "Not Your Birthday" was used to promote the film. It was later included in iPhone/iPod app Tap Tap Revenge 4 as a free soundtrack song. Additionally, Example's "Kickstarts" was used in the trailer and Katy Perry's "Firework" was used in the trailer of the film and during the actual prom scene of the film. The soundtrack was released under Disney's Hollywood Records label, three days before the film's premiere date.

Award

Young Artist Awards

|-
| style="text-align:center;" rowspan="1"| 2012
| rowspan="1"|Robbie Tucker
| Best Performance in a Feature Film – Young Actor Ten and Under
|

References

External links

2011 films
2011 romantic comedy-drama films
2011 soundtrack albums
2010s teen comedy-drama films
2010s teen romance films
American high school films
American romantic comedy-drama films
American screwball comedy films
American teen comedy-drama films
American teen romance films
Films about proms
Films directed by Joe Nussbaum
Films scored by Deborah Lurie
Films set in Michigan
Films shot in Los Angeles
Hollywood Records soundtracks
Walt Disney Pictures films
2010s English-language films
2010s American films